Arta Terme is a comune (municipality) in the Province of Udine in the Italian region Friuli-Venezia Giulia, located about  northwest of Trieste and about  northwest of Udine in the Val Bût, part of the Alpine traditional region of Carnia.

Main sights

Church of Santo Spirito (15th century)
Church of San Nicolò (15th century)

Twin towns
Arta Terme is twinned with:

  Noale, Italy

References

External links
 Official website

Cities and towns in Friuli-Venezia Giulia